Marc Thomas Treadwell (born August 6, 1955) is the Chief United States district judge of the United States District Court for the Middle District of Georgia.

Early life and education
Treadwell was born in Fort Campbell, Kentucky in 1955 and graduated from Blackshear High School in 1973. He earned a Bachelor of Arts degree in 1978 from Valdosta State University and a Juris Doctor in 1981 from the Walter F. George School of Law at Mercer University.

Professional career
From 1981 until 1985, Treadwell served as an associate for the Atlanta law firm of Kilpatrick & Cody (now Kilpatrick Stockton). He then served as an associate for the Macon, Georgia law firm Chambless, Higdon & Carson LLP from 1985 until 1987 and then as a partner with that firm from 1987 until 2000. From 2000 until 2010, Treadwell was a partner in the Macon, Georgia firm Adams, Jordan & Treadwell, where he specialized in personal injury and wrongful death. He also has been an adjunct professor at his alma mater, the Walter F. George School of Law at Mercer University, since 1998.

Federal judicial service
On February 4, 2010, President Obama nominated Treadwell to serve on the United States District Court for the Middle District of Georgia, to fill the vacancy created by Judge Hugh Lawson, who assumed senior status at the end of 2008. On March 18, 2010, the United States Senate Committee on the Judiciary reported Treadwell's nomination to the full Senate. The full Senate confirmed Treadwell on June 21, 2010 by an 89–0 vote. He received his commission on June 22, 2010. He has served as Chief Judge since July 1, 2020.

References

External links

1955 births
Living people
20th-century American lawyers
21st-century American judges
21st-century American lawyers
Georgia (U.S. state) lawyers
Judges of the United States District Court for the Middle District of Georgia
Mercer University alumni
Mercer University faculty
United States district court judges appointed by Barack Obama
Valdosta State University alumni